Gupta is a common Indian surname.

Gupta may also refer to:

 Gupta Empire
 Gupta (king), founder of the Gupta dynasty
 Gupta era, a calendar era used by the Gupta rulers
 Gupta script, the script used for writing Sanskrit during the Gupta Empire in India
 Gupta–Bleuler formalism, a way of quantizing the electromagnetic field.
 Gupta Technologies, a software development company
 Gupta, a main character in the TV series Outsourced portrayed by Parvesh Cheena
 Gupta family, an Indian-South African business family

See also
 Gupt: The Hidden Truth, 1997 Indian film